Jalan Besar Group Representation Constituency is a four-member Group Representation Constituency composed of several city suburbs along with the Central Area of Singapore. The Jalan Besar GRC is the electoral division representing the largest area of the downtown city centre of Singapore, followed by Tanjong Pagar GRC. There are four wards in the GRC: Kreta Ayer-Kim Seng, Kolam Ayer, Whampoa and lastly Kampong Glam. The current Members of Parliament are Josephine Teo, Heng Chee How, Denise Phua and Wan Rizal Wan Zakariah from the People's Action Party (PAP).

History 
It is named after Jalan Besar, a street in Singapore that forms this GRC's centrepiece. The street itself is within the Kallang planning area, Kallang itself being part of this GRC. The GRC encompasses several heritage areas, including Little India, Desker Road, Kolam Ayer and Crawford in the North. Kreta Ayer-Kim Seng itself includes the Singapore River, Chinatown and Bukit Ho Swee. 

During 1988 general election, the three-member PAP team led by Lee Boon Yang won the election with 62.68% of the votes against the WP with 37.32% of the votes.

Jalan Besar GRC has been contested by the opposition at every election, except 1991. 

During 1997 general election, the four-member PAP team led by Lee Boon Yang won the election with 67.55% of the votes against the WP with 32.45% of the votes.

During 2001 general election, the five-member PAP team led by Lee Boon Yang won the election with 74.49% of the votes against the SDA  led by Desmond Lim with 25.51% of the votes.

During 2006 general election, the five-member PAP team led by Lee Boon Yang won the election with 69.26% of the votes against the SDA with 30.74% of the votes.

Jalan Besar GRC was dissolved ahead of the 2011 elections and along with Moulmein from Tanjong Pagar GRC to form Moulmein–Kallang Group Representation Constituency while a majority of the Kreta Ayer–Kim Seng and Whampoa were redrawn into Tanjong Pagar GRC and as a SMC, respectively.

However, its GRC were again reformed one parliamentary term later in 2015 Singaporean general election, where changes made from a majority of the GRC were reversed, while the Jalan Besar division was dissolved into other wards.

In 2015 Singaporean general election, the four-member PAP team led by Lily Neo won the election  with 67.75% of the votes while WP got 32.25% of the votes.

In 2020 general election, the four-member PAP team led by Josephine Teo  won the election with 65.36% of the votes while the Peoples Voice led by Lim Tean obtained 34.64% of the votes.

Town Council

Jalan Besar GRC is managed by the Jalan Besar Town Council.

Members of Parliament

Choo resigned before being charged and convicted in 1999 for cheating offences. However, no by-election was called on the ground since it was a Group Representation Constituency, and the workload for the Whampoa ward was distributed among the rest of the team.

Electoral results

Elections in 1980s

Elections in 1990s

Elections in 2000s

Elections in 2010s

Elections in 2020s

See also
Jalan Besar SMC
Moulmein–Kallang GRC

References 

2015 establishments in Singapore
Singaporean electoral divisions
Bukit Merah
Downtown Core (Singapore)
Kallang
Marina South
Novena, Singapore
Outram, Singapore
Rochor
Singapore River
Straits View